Mount Barker High School is a public high school located in the Adelaide Hills, 34 kilometres east of Adelaide. It was founded in 1908, celebrating its centenary in 2008.

Positive psychology
In partnership with St Peter's College, Mount Barker High School is piloting Dr Martin Seligman's positive psychology theories in education.
The positive psychology framework is based around the PERMA framework
which requires only saying things in the Positive, rather than the negative. Using methods including peer mentoring and open opportunities to work on 'open mindsets'.

References

External links
Mount Barker High School

High schools in South Australia
Public schools in South Australia
Educational institutions established in 1908
1908 establishments in Australia